

Eleanor Constance Lodge  (18 September 1869, Hanley, Staffordshire – 19 March 1936) was a British academic who served as vice-principal of Lady Margaret Hall, Oxford from 1906 to 1921 and then principal of Westfield College, Hampstead, in the University of London, from 1921 to 1931.

Biography
She was the youngest child, and only daughter, of Oliver Lodge (1826–1884), a china clay merchant, and his wife, Grace (née Heath) (1826–1879). Her siblings included Sir Oliver Lodge (1851–1940), physicist; Sir Richard Lodge (1855–1936), historian; and Alfred Lodge (1854–1937), mathematician.

She studied history at Lady Margaret Hall until 1894. In 1895, Elizabeth Wordsworth asked her to come back to Lady Margaret Hall, where she became a librarian. She then studied in Paris, at the École des Chartes and the École des hautes études en sciences sociales, 1898–1899. In 1899, she started teaching History at LMH as a tutor, and was appointed as vice-principal in 1906. Although she expected to be appointed as the principal after Henrietta Jex-Blake retired, this didn't happen, and she decided to leave Oxford. She asked for a teaching job in Westfield College, London. She was in fact appointed as principal of this college, in succession to Bertha Phillpotts, in 1921.

She was the first woman recipient of a D.Litt. by the University of Oxford, in 1928, which was awarded for her work in the field of modern history. She was honoured by a CBE in 1932. She died aged 66 on 19 March 1936 in Windsor, Berkshire and was buried at Wolvercote Cemetery, near Oxford.

Published works
Life of the Black Prince, By Chandos Herald. Oxford: Clarendon Press, 1910. Editor, with Mildred K. Pope.
Gascony under English Rule (London, 1926)

References

Sources

 Frances Lannon, “Lodge, Eleanor Constance (1869–1936)”, Oxford Dictionary of National Biography, Oxford University Press, 2004

External links

1869 births
1936 deaths
People from Hanley, Staffordshire
20th-century English historians
20th-century English women writers
British women historians
Commanders of the Order of the British Empire
First women admitted to degrees at Oxford
Fellows of Lady Margaret Hall, Oxford
People associated with Westfield College
Members of Hampstead Metropolitan Borough Council
Women councillors in England
Burials at Wolvercote Cemetery